Nail Files is a reality television series that premiere on TV Guide Network in June 2011. It ran for 2 seasons and ended in October 2012.

Nail Files is created by the creators of Jersey Shore, and follows Katie Cazorla, who owns a popular  Sherman Oaks salon called The Painted Nail, while juggling her relationship with Walter Afanasieff, a Grammy award-winning music producer.

The series follows Cazorla as she aspires to take The Painted Nail to the next level.  With the support of Walter and her best friend Amy, Cazorla hosts gifting suites at the Sundance Film Festival and The Academy Awards, walks the red carpet at the Grammy Awards, launches her Spring line of polishes, and handles her celebrity clients all while placating her trouble-making staff.

References

2010s American reality television series
2011 American television series debuts
2012 American television series endings
Pop (American TV channel) original programming